Series 31 of University Challenge began on 23 July 2001, with the final on 11 March 2002.

Results
 Winning teams are highlighted in bold.
 Teams with green scores (winners) returned in the next round, while those with red scores (losers) were eliminated.
 Teams with orange scores have lost, but survived as the first round losers with the highest losing scores.
 A score in italics indicates a match decided on a tie-breaker question.

First round

NOTE: Even though both Cardiff and Leeds scored 145 points, Leeds reached their total "in a shorter time, and with fewer wrong answers".

Highest Scoring Losers Playoffs

Second round

Quarter-finals

Semi-finals

Final

 The trophy and title were awarded to the Somerville team comprising Luke Pitcher, Dorjana Širola, Tim Austen, and Vicki Wood.
 The trophy was presented by Mary Warnock.

References

External links
 University Challenge Homepage
 Blanchflower Results Table

2001
2001 British television seasons
2002 British television seasons